This article shows the rosters of all participating teams at the women's goalball tournament at the 2020 Summer Paralympics in Tokyo.

Group C

Australia

Canada

China

Israel

RPC

Group D

Brazil

Egypt

Japan

Turkey

United States

See also
Goalball at the 2020 Summer Paralympics – Men's team rosters

References

2
Women's team rosters
2020 in women's sport